The men's rugby sevens tournament at the 2019 Pacific Games was held in Samoa from 12 to 13 July 2019. It was hosted at the St Joseph's Sports Field in Lotopa. Fiji won the gold medal with a 7–5 victory over Samoa in the final.

Participating nations
Ten teams with 12 players in each squad played in the tournament.

Pool stages

Pool A

Pool B

Medal playoffs

9th-place play-off

7th-place play-off

5th-place play-off

Bronze medal match

Gold medal match

See also
 Rugby sevens at the Pacific Games
 Rugby sevens at the 2019 Pacific Games – Women's tournament

References

Men